Miguel Lopez Perito was the Paraguayan Minister of the Presidency under President Fernando Lugo.

References

Living people
Government ministers of Paraguay
Year of birth missing (living people)
Place of birth missing (living people)
21st-century Paraguayan politicians